The Harşit River (Turkish: Harşit Çayı, Philabonites or Χαρσιώτης River) is a river in the Black Sea Region of Turkey. It flows through the Gümüşhane and Giresun Provinces before its terminus in the Black Sea at Tirebolu. It is interrupted by the Torul and Kürtün Dams.

References

Rivers of Turkey
Tributaries of the Black Sea
Rivers of Giresun Province
Rivers of Gümüşhane Province